Ajagara Assembly constituency is one of the 403 constituencies of the Uttar Pradesh Legislative Assembly, India. It is a part of the Varanasi district and one of the five assembly constituencies in the Chandauli Lok Sabha constituency. First assembly election in this assembly constituency was conducted in 2012 after the constituency came into existence in the year 2008 as a result of the "Delimitation of Parliamentary and Assembly Constituencies Order, 2008".

Wards / Areas

Ajagara Assembly constituency comprises KCs Palahi Patti, Ajagara, PCs Dallipur, Rasulpur, Shahpur, Babatpur, Raisipatti, Surwa, Harhua, Birapatti, Koirajpur, Ausanpur, Undi, Sabhaipur, Ekla, Garwa, Paschimpur, Gauri, Parsadpur, Hathiwar, Puarikala, Puarikhurd & Bhopapur of Harahaua KC of Pindra Tehsil.

Members of the Legislative Assembly

Election results

2022

2012
16th Vidhan Sabha: 2012 General Elections

See also

Chandauli district
Chandauli Lok Sabha constituency
Government of Uttar Pradesh
List of Vidhan Sabha constituencies of Uttar Pradesh
Uttar Pradesh
Uttar Pradesh Legislative Assembly

References

External links
 

Assembly constituencies of Uttar Pradesh
Politics of Varanasi district
Constituencies established in 2008
2008 establishments in Uttar Pradesh